The Road to Christmas is a 2006 American made-for-television romantic comedy film directed by Mark Jean and starring Jennifer Grey, Megan Park, and Clark Gregg. Written by Judd Parkin, The Road to Christmas first aired on December 17, 2006 on Lifetime. It was released on DVD on October 26, 2010 by A&E Home Video.

Synopsis 
The film is about a successful fashion photographer whose planned Christmas wedding in Aspen is interrupted by a snow storm. With no flights or rental cars available, she accepts a ride from a widowed school teacher and his 13-year-old daughter, who open up their home to her until the roads clear.

Cast
 Jennifer Grey as Claire Jameson
 Megan Park as Hilly Pullman
 Clark Gregg as Tom Pullman
 Barbara Gordon as Rheduel Pullman
 Jean Michel Paré as Lorenzo
 Thom Allison as Michele
 Marvin Ishmael as Jitu
 Pat Thornton as Tiny
 Kelly Fiddick as Cootie
 Lorne Cardinal as Chaba
 Ingrid Hart as N'naa
 Naomi Snieckus as Rose
 Michelle Moffat as Airport Clerk
 Jessica Booker as Enid
 Tantoo Cardinal as Sioux Woman

See also
 List of Christmas films

References

External links
 
 
 

2006 television films
2006 films
2006 romantic comedy films
American Christmas comedy films
American romantic comedy films
Christmas television films
Lifetime (TV network) films
2000s Christmas comedy films
Films directed by Mark Jean
2000s American films